Utricularia sandwithii is a small, probably perennial, carnivorous plant that belongs to the genus Utricularia. U. sandwithii is endemic to Brazil, Guyana, Suriname, and Venezuela. U. sandwithii was originally described and published by Peter Taylor in 1967 for the Botany of the Guyana Highland series, though it was probably collected as early as 1851 by Heinrich Wullschlägel in Suriname. It had also been collected by George Samuel Jenman in 1881 in Guyana, but was overlooked until Taylor presented his work in 1967.

See also 
 List of Utricularia species

References 

Carnivorous plants of South America
Flora of Brazil
Flora of Guyana
Flora of Suriname
Flora of Venezuela
sandwithii